Pobre diable may refer to:

Pobre diablo (1940 film), 1940 Mexican film, also known by the English title [[Poor Devil (1940 film)|Poor Devil]]''
"Pobre diablo" (song), Spanish language title of the song "Pauvres Diables" by Julio Iglesias